The Pennsylvania Auditor General Election, 2008 was held on Election Day. Incumbent Democrat Jack Wagner of Pittsburgh was unopposed for the Democratic nomination.  Republican Chet Beiler, a construction executive from Penn Township, Lancaster County, was also unopposed for the Republican nomination after primary opponent Chris Walsh withdrew from the race, citing problems with his nomination petitions. Wagner had previously served as a State Senator, while Beiler had no prior political experience, but was a manufacturing executive.

See also
Pennsylvania elections, 2008

2008 Pennsylvania elections
Pennsylvania Auditor General elections
November 2008 events in the United States
Pennsylvania